Abdul Yabré (born 3 April 1995) is a footballer who plays as a midfielder for Italian  club Carpi. Born in Italy, he represents Burkina Faso internationally.

Professional career
Yabré passed through the Cesena youth academy for 10 years, before being transferred to Vibonese.

International career
Yabré was born in Italy to Burkinabé parents, and made his debut for the Burkina Faso national team in a friendly 3–0 loss to Chile on 2 June 2017.

References

External links
Sky Sports Italy Profile
Risultati Profile

 

1995 births
Living people
Sportspeople from the Province of Naples
Footballers from Campania
Italian people of Burkinabé descent
Italian sportspeople of African descent
Sportspeople of Burkinabé descent
Citizens of Burkina Faso through descent
Burkinabé footballers
Italian footballers
Association football midfielders
Serie C players
Serie D players
A.C. Cesena players
Santarcangelo Calcio players
U.S. Vibonese Calcio players
F.C. Lumezzane V.G.Z. A.S.D. players
S.S.D. Jesina Calcio players
F.C. Legnago Salus players
A.C. Carpi players
Burkina Faso international footballers
21st-century Burkinabé people